The BLVD Collection is trio of 427 ft (130m) tall skyscrapers in Jersey City, New Jersey, including the 17th tallest building in Jersey City. When it was completed, it was the tallest residential building in Jersey City.

The first building, originally known as Marbella Apartments, was submitted for city planning board approval in 1998 and completed in 2003; the first completed building has 40 floors, containing 412 apartments.

A second tower, originally called M2, opened in June 2016 and is slightly taller than the original one at 450 ft (137 m) and 38 floors, with 300 apartments.

See also
 List of tallest buildings in Jersey City

References

Apartment buildings in Jersey City, New Jersey
Residential skyscrapers in Jersey City, New Jersey
Residential buildings completed in 2003
Skyscrapers in Jersey City, New Jersey